Michael Grecco (born May 20, 1958) is an American photographer, film director and author.

Early life and education
Grecco was born in the Bronx and grew up near New York City. He received his first camera (a Mamiya/Sekor 35mm single-lens reflex) when he was 12. He  attended Boston University, where he studied filmmaking and photojournalism as an undergraduate at BU's School of Communications. During his time at Boston University he also studied with photography historian and photographer Carl Chiarenza.

Career
While in college, Grecco began working as a freelance photographer for the Associated Press and then later became a staff photographer at Boston Herald. He also shot the burgeoning new music scene for Boston Rock Magazine and the Boston radio station WBCN, documenting Boston's "pivotal role in launching the punk rock explosion" of the 1970s. During the same time period, he began his career as a magazine photographer working for the Picture Group Agency based in Providence Rhode Island. His early work appeared in magazines including Time, Newsweek, Esquire, Vanity Fair,  and Rolling Stone.

Grecco moved to Los Angeles in the late 1980s.  As a contributor to People,  his coverage of events such as the Golden Globes, the Emmy Awards and the Academy Awards led to his career as a celebrity portrait photographer.  In 1993 he was asked to photograph a special edition of Businessweek called the "Entrepreneurs That Matter", traveling the world photographing the most important entrepreneurs of the day. That lead to being asked by Fox Broadcasting to shoot a new show, The X-Files, where he helped define the look of the show by "cross processing" color negative film in color slide chemistry and using special camera filters. In 2015 he created the first Cinemagraph to ever be used as a broadcast television spot for Pizza Hut, during the Turner Broadcasting show, Billy on the Street.   

His subjects have included Martin Scorsese, Robert Duvall, Johnny Cash, Will Ferrell, Kanye West, Mel Brooks, Ben Stiller, Penélope Cruz, Jet Li, Bill Murray, Joaquin Phoenix and Gwen Stefani. He has shot covers for Time, Wired, Entertainment Weekly, ESPN, and People, among other publications.

Grecco's first two books were on lighting techniques in photographic portraiture. In 2007, he released Naked Ambition: An R Rated Look at an X Rated Industry, a collection of photographs on the American porn industry and its stars taken at the AVN Awards and Convention in Las Vegas.  He also directed a documentary of the same name that premiered in April 2009. In 2020, a collection of Grecco's photos, 
Punk, Post Punk, New Wave: Onstage, Backstage, In Your Face, 1978-1991, was published by Abrams Books. A "photographic document of a critical pocket of the American punk scene in all its brash and seedy glory,"  the photos from the book were first exhibited at Photo London in 2021. In early 2022, a touring exhibit of the photos, Days of Punk, premiered at La Termica Museum in Malaga, Spain. Days of Punk was subsequently exhibited in England and at the Southeast Museum of Photography.

Awards and recognition
In 1995 Photo District News named Grecco in their “Lighting Master” series. Grecco has received 5 Awards of Excellence from Communication Arts Magazine and in June 2001 was [named a Hasselblad Master. He also received several awards in the 2011 Prix de la Photographie Paris competition including ones for his portraits of Steve Martin and Martin Scorsese and in 2012 was one of the eight recipients of the Professional Photographer Leadership Award from the United Nations International Photographic Council. As a staff photographer for the Boston Herald, he won several Boston Press Photographers awards.

Bibliography
The Art of Portrait Photography, Creative Lighting Techniques and Strategies, 126 pages. Amherst Media (2000). 
Lighting and the Dramatic Portrait, the Art of Celebrity and Editorial Photography, 192 pages. Amphoto (2006). 
Naked Ambition: An R Rated Look at an X Rated Industry, 224 pages. Rock Out Books (2007). 
''Punk, Post Punk, New Wave: Onstage, Backstage, In Your Face, 1978-1991, 240 pages, Abrams Books (2020),

Personal life
Grecco is based in Los Angeles.  He has three children. He and his wife, Elizabeth Waterman, a photographer  and the CEO of Black + Gold, a marketing agency, were married in 2018.

References

External links 
 
 Days of Punk

American portrait photographers
Boston University College of Communication alumni
1958 births
Living people